Methionine sulfoximine (MSO) is an irreversible glutamine synthetase inhibitor. It is the sulfoximine derivative of methionine with convulsant effects.

Methionine sulfoximine is composed of two different diastereomers, which are L-S-Methionine sulfoximine and L-R-Methionine sulfoximine. These affect the longevity of the model mouse for Lou Gehrig's disease. Overproduction of glutamate results to excitotoxicity, which kills the cell. Since methionine sulfoximine inhibits glutamate production in the brain, it prevents excitotoxicity. Thus, increasing the longevity of the mice.

Mechanism of action
MSO is phosphorylated by glutamine synthetase. The resulting product acts as a transition state analog that is unable to diffuse from the active site, thereby inhibiting the enzyme.

References

Convulsants
Glutamine synthetase inhibitors
Amino acid derivatives
Sulfoximines